Mattias Anderson "Mick" Schade (25 March 1887 – 9 June 1958) was an Australian rules footballer who played with Richmond in the Victorian Football League (VFL).

He made two appearances for Richmond, both in the 1911 VFL season.

Later, in the 1921/22 Sheffield Shield season, Schade played a first-class cricket match for Victoria against South Australia at Adelaide Oval. A right-arm fast-medium opening bowler, Schade took 1/35 in a convincing innings and 232 runs win.

See also
 List of Victoria first-class cricketers

Notes

External links 

1887 births
1958 deaths
Australian rules footballers from Bendigo
Richmond Football Club players
Australian cricketers
Victoria cricketers
Cricketers from Victoria (Australia)